Secada is a surname. Notable people with the surname include:

Jon Secada (born 1961), Cuban American and Afro-Cuban singer-songwriter
Moraima Secada (1930–1984), Cuban singer